Soyuz at the Guiana Space Centre (also known as Soyuz at CSG or Arianespace Soyuz) was a European Space Agency (ESA) programme for operating Soyuz-ST launch vehicles from Centre Spatial Guyanais (CSG), providing medium-size launch capability for Arianespace to complement the light Vega and heavy-lift Ariane 5. The Soyuz vehicle was supplied by the Roscosmos with TsSKB-Progress and NPO Lavochkin, while additional components were supplied by Airbus, Thales Group and RUAG. Autor LV (ICBM) = NPO "Energia", Kaliningrad.

The Arianespace Soyuz project was announced by the ESA in 2002. Cooperation with Russia began in two areas: construction of a launch site for Soyuz in CSG and development of the Soyuz launch vehicle modified for the Guiana Space Centre. A Programme Declaration was signed in 2003 and funding along with final approval was granted on 4 February 2005. Initial excavation for the Ensemble de Lancement Soyouz (ELS; Soyuz Launch Complex) began in 2005, construction started in 2007, and the launch complex was completed in early 2011, allowing Arianespace to offer launch services on the modified Soyuz ST-B to its clients. Two early flights, VS02 and VS04, and a recent flight, VS17, used the Soyuz ST-A variant. Since 2011, Arianespace has ordered a total of 23 Soyuz rockets, enough to cover its needs until 2019 at a pace of three to four launches per year. Due to Russia's invasion of Ukraine, Soyuz launches from the Guiana Space Centre have been suspended.

Features of modified Soyuz for the Guiana Space Centre 
 First use of a mobile service tower at the ELS that enabled vertical payload integration.
 European supplied payload adapters.
 European supplied KSE, a system to locate and transmit a flight termination signal. It would command the engines to shut down and leave the vehicle in a ballistic trajectory.
 Adaptation of the S-Band telemetry system on all stages from the 5 TM bands available at Baikonur, and Plesetsk to the 3 allowed at the CSG range.
 Adaptation of the S-Band telemetry coding and frequency to the Inter-Range Instrumentation Group (IRIG) standard used at CSG.
 Adaptation of the oxygen purge system for directing to the outside of the mobile gantry.
 Adaptation to the tropical CSG climate including the adaptation of the air conditioning system to local specifications and protective measures to avoid icing. All holes and cavities were studied and certified to be adequately protected against intrusion of insects and rodents.
 The four boosters and the core stage were upgraded with pyrotechnic devices to breach the fuel tanks to assure that they would sink in the ocean. The other stages were shown to lose structural integrity on impact and thus proven to sink.
 At least initially, the boosters and core stage would use the pyrotechnically ignited 14D22 (RD-107A) and 14D23 (RD-108A) rather than the chemically ignited 14D22 KhZ and 14D23 KhZ used on the rest of the Soyuz-2.

Vehicle processing 
Soyuz components arrived at the CSG via ship, and were unloaded and placed in a storage area. From there, the components were brought to the Launch Vehicle Integration Building where they were assembled horizontally in an air-conditioned environment. First four boosters were attached to the core stage, and then the third stage was attached to the core – identical to the procedure at Baikonur and Plesetsk Cosmodrome. Separately, the payload was mounted on a dispenser in a Payload Processing Facility and then transferred into the S3B building to be mounted to the Fregat upper stage and then encapsulated in a fairing. Subsequently, the first 3 stages of the Soyuz-ST were transported from the Integration Building to the launch pad by a train which also erected the rocket to the vertical position at the pad, where Soyuz was suspended by four support arms. Once vertical, a mobile gantry moved in and enclosed Soyuz. Following that the encapsulated Fregat and payload was lifted vertically by a mobile gantry to be mounted on top of Soyuz. The Mobile Gantry was retracted an hour before the launch.

Future developments 
Arianespace planned to operate Soyuz until at least the end of 2019, and as of 2014 intended to continue operating Soyuz alongside the planned Ariane 6 when that launcher makes its debut. However, the announcement of new Ariane 6 designs from Airbus and Safran opens the possibility of Ariane 6.2 replacing Soyuz. As Ariane 6 flight test slips to 2022, several flights were planned for Soyuz as late as 2022 before the Russians pulled out.

Launch history

Inaugural flight 
The first contract for the launch of Soyuz ST-B from Centre Spatial Guyanais (CSG) was signed at the 2009 Paris Air Show by the Director of the Galileo Programme and Navigation-related Activities René Oosterlinck and a CEO of Arianespace Jean-Yves Le Gall. This contract covered 2 launches of two Galileo satellites each. The contract for the satellites themselves had already been signed by ESA and Galileo Industries in 2006.

Launch vehicle components shipped from Saint Petersburg first arrived in French Guiana by ship in November 2009. The Soyuz Launch Site acceptance review took place during the last week of March 2011, leading to the first simulated launch campaign between 29 April and 4 May 2011. The launch site was officially handed over from ESA to the Arianespace on 7 May 2011.

Assembly of the Soyuz ST-B begun on 12 September 2011 in the Assembly and Testing building, while two Galileo satellites underwent final tests after their arrival from Thales Alenia Space facilities in Italy on 7 and 14 September 2011. The launch was planned for 20 October 2011, however an anomaly was detected in the pneumatic system responsible for disconnecting the fuel lines from Soyuz third stage, forcing the mission to be postponed for 24 hours. On 21 October 2011, at 10:30 UTC, Soyuz ST-B took off for its inaugural, 3 hour 49 minute, flight, making it the first time Soyuz was launched outside of the former Soviet Union territory.

Flight VS09 
On 22 August 2014, Arianespace launched the first two Full Operational Capability satellites for the Galileo satellite navigation constellation into medium Earth orbit. The mission appeared to proceed normally and Arianespace reported the launch to be a success, however analysis of telemetry data provided by ESA and CNES tracking stations showed that the satellites were injected into an incorrect orbit.

The orbit was determined by the European Space Operations Centre within 3 hours after the separation from launcher, and the satellites were operating normally and under control. Both satellites were switched to safe mode, pointing at the sun while both ESA/CNES and OHB teams investigated the failure and options for the satellites.

On 25 August 2014, Arianespace announced the creation of an independent inquiry commission to investigate the anomaly. On 28 August 2014, details emerged on the events that most likely led to a failure of the Fregat upper stage. At the end of the re-orientation phase the flight control system detected an incorrect angular speed and unsuccessfully attempted to use thrusters to correct the situation. The flight control system did not detect the thruster issue and continued the flight plan with the upper stage oriented in a wrong direction, leaving the satellites in an incorrect orbit.

In late September 2014, the Roscosmos commission report, quoted by Izvestia, indicated that the Fregat failure was due to a design flaw leading to freezing in one of the hydrazine propellant lines, which was placed alongside a line carrying cold helium used for pressurization of the main propellant tanks. During the long first burn required for Galileo orbital insertion the propellant line was cooled to below the freezing point of hydrazine. Further investigations were focused on the software error and a means to prevent similar failures in future. Izvestia also reported that the failure of flight VS09 caused a serious reaction in Russian government. Oleg Ostapenko, head of Roscosmos, had a "difficult conversation in the (Moscow) White House".

On 7 October 2014, the Independent Inquiry Board announced the conclusions of its investigation, revealing that a proximity of helium and hydrazine feed lines resulted in a thermal bridge that caused an interruption of propellant supply to the thrusters. Ambiguities in the design documents allowing this to happen were a result of not taking into account thermal transfers in the thermal analyses of the stage system design. The Board recommended 3 corrective actions: Revamping thermal analysis, correcting design documents and modification of manufacture, assembly, integration and inspection procedures of the supply lines.

In November 2014, ESA announced the satellites would perform a total of 15 orbital maneuvers to raise their perigee to 17,339 km. This would reduce the satellites' exposure to the Van Allen radiation belt, reduce the doppler effect, increase satellite visibility from the ground, and allow the satellites to keep their antennas pointed at Earth during perigee. These orbits would repeat the same ground track every 20 days, allowing synchronization with other Galileo satellites which repeat the same ground track every 10 days. Once in their new orbits the satellites could begin in-orbit testing.

Recovery of the satellites concluded in March 2015, when Galileo-FOC FM2 entered a new orbit, mirrored to the orbit of Galileo-FOC FM1, which concluded its manoeuvres on the end of November 2014 and successfully passed testing. Currently satellites overfly the same location on the ground every 20 days, comparing to 10 days of standard Galileo satellites.

Missions

Launch sequence 

Typically, operations 3 days before launch include countdown rehearsal for all stages as well as final preparations and verification of the Fregat upper stage. Two days before launch preparations for fueling begin. This is also the last day when pre-launch activity with the payload can occur. The launch sequence is optimized for each mission, the sequence described here is based on flight VS07 which lifted the Sentinel-1A satellite:

References 

R-7 (rocket family)
Space launch vehicles of Europe
European Space Agency
France–Russia relations
Roscosmos
Guiana Space Centre
Arianespace